Cameron Tatum (born July 20, 1988) is an American professional basketball player for Renata Basquete/Rio Claro Basquete of the Novo Basquete Brasil (NBB).

References

External links
 at NBADraft.net
 at ESPN.com
 at FIBA.com
 at Eurobasket.com
 at UTSports.com
 at aba-liga.com

1988 births
Living people
ABA League players
AEK Larnaca B.C. players
American expatriate basketball people in Brazil
American expatriate basketball people in Cyprus
American expatriate basketball people in Montenegro
American expatriate basketball people in Poland
American expatriate basketball people in the Dominican Republic
American expatriate basketball people in Venezuela
Bakersfield Jam players
Guaiqueríes de Margarita players
KK Mornar Bar players
Small forwards
Basketball players from Miami
Tennessee Volunteers basketball players
Turów Zgorzelec players
American men's basketball players